Mount Lodge, also named Boundary Peak 166, is a mountain in Alaska and British Columbia, located on the Canada–United States border, and part of the Fairweather Range of the Saint Elias Mountains. It was named in 1908 for Senator Henry Cabot Lodge, (1850-1924), U.S. Boundary Commissioner in 1903.

See also
List of Boundary Peaks of the Alaska-British Columbia/Yukon border

References

Mountains of Alaska
Three-thousanders of British Columbia
Saint Elias Mountains
Canada–United States border
International mountains of North America
Mountains of Yakutat City and Borough, Alaska